are fictional animals that debuted in the Jewelpet franchise created jointly by Sanrio and Sega Sammy Holdings. They are all named after famous birthstones and jewels, each with a different kind of jewel for their eyes, used for casting magic. In the entire franchise, there are a total of 42 Jewelpets in each species and class.

According to the franchise's backstory, the Jewelpets themselves were all born from jewels and minerals after a powerful magician used their magic to bring them to life. They live in a mystical place called Jewel Land, attending a school to learn more about magic and each of them were paired with their own human partners.

Physiology and appearance
A Jewelpet's appearance depends on which species they are based on. They have small bodies with little arms and legs and a big head. Each Jewelpet has signature glass-like irises called Jewel Eyes, special eyes that are colored differently depending on their Magical Class. The eyes were used by a Jewelpet itself to cast magic; however, in order to master it, rigorous training should be done. Jewelpets can also walk using their legs but sometimes goes on all fours when running. They can also fly using magical broomsticks as well, but some pets like Rin, Io and Aqua don't use brooms to fly. This concept however was forgotten in the second series, Jewelpet Twinkle.

Each Jewelpet's size also depends on the species, with the biggest being Rald, who is the same size as a human being while the smallest is Charotte, who is much smaller than a regular-sized Jewelpet. Jewelpets are also capable of human speech and can understand both Jewel Landian language and human language altogether. However, a few exceptions were done to some, like Rald.

Jewelpets

Mascot Trio

Magical Red Class

Magical Green Class

Magical Blue Class

Magical Black Class

Sweetspets
First debuting in the end of 2011,  are a distant relative to the Jewelpets which are animals based entirely on desserts. Like the Jewelpets themselves, they share the same body size and aesthetics but differs due to the lack of Jewel Eyes and instead having some body parts made of sweets. All of the Sweetspets hail from Sweets Land, a country where everything is made of desserts and confectioneries.

They are also magicians, able to cast a magic spell called Sweets Flash and have an ability to regenerate their lost body parts on their bodies. It is explained in Jewelpet the Movie: Sweets Dance Princess that the regeneration ability is because of the Sweetspets getting their powers from the legendary Candy Tower, where all Sweetspets are born.

Other pets 
There are some pet characters who are not officially classified as a Jewelpet or a Sweetspet.

See also
Jewelpet

References
https://web.archive.org/web/20130116064848/http://jewelpet.info/character/index.html
http://www.jewelpet.jp/character/index.html

Further reading
Strawberry News: Jewelpet Special (September 10, 2008 Issue), Sanrio.
Strawberry News: Jewelpet Special (March 10, 2010 Issue), Sanrio.
Jewelpet: Secret Glittering Encyclopedia (2009), Sanrio. 
Ueda Michi and Jewelpet Production Committee, Shogakukan TV Picture Book: Jewelpet 33 Character Array (2009), Shogakukan. 
Jewelpet Production Committee, Super TV Encyclopedia: Jewelpet Character Dictionary (2009), Shogakukan. 
Jewelpet Production Committee, Super TV Encyclopedia: Jewelpet Private Dictionary (2009), Shogakukan. 
Otona Anime Collection: Jewelpet Sunshine Fan Book (June 2012), Yosensha. 
Jewelpet: The Fuss in the Jewel Festival!? (May 15, 2012), Kadokawa Shoten. 

Jewelpets and Sweetspets